Neoclarkinella is a genus of braconid wasps in the family Braconidae. There are about seven described species in Neoclarkinella.

Species
These seven species belong to the genus Neoclarkinella:
 Neoclarkinella ariadne (Nixon, 1965) (China, India, Sri Lanka)
 Neoclarkinella curvinervus (Song & Chen, 2014) (China)
 Neoclarkinella janakikkadensis Veena, 2014 (India)
 Neoclarkinella narendrani Veena, 2014 (India)
 Neoclarkinella punctata Ahmad, Pandey, Haider & Shujauddin, 2005 (India)
 Neoclarkinella sundana (Wilkinson, 1930) (Indonesia)
 Neoclarkinella vitellinipes (You & Zhou, 1990) (China, India)

References

Microgastrinae